Sükheegiin Tserenchimed (Mongolian: Сүхээгийн Цэрэнчимэд) is a Mongolian freestyle wrestler. She holds a gold medal in the 60 kg bracket at the 2014 World Wrestling Championships and a silver medal in the same bracket in the 2015 World Wrestling Championships.

References

External links
sports.org - profile
2014 World Championships preview in women’s freestyle wrestling at 60 kg/132 lbs.

Videos
World Championship 2014 - Final

Mongolian female sport wrestlers
1995 births
Living people
Wrestlers at the 2014 Asian Games
Asian Games medalists in wrestling
World Wrestling Championships medalists
Asian Games bronze medalists for Mongolia
People from Khentii Province
Medalists at the 2014 Asian Games
World Wrestling Champions
20th-century Mongolian women
21st-century Mongolian women